Ancylolomia pectinifera is a moth in the family Crambidae. It was described by George Hampson in 1910. It is found in Kenya, Somalia, South Africa, Zambia and Zimbabwe.

References

Ancylolomia
Moths described in 1910
Moths of Africa